Exercise Tocsin was an emergency preparedness drill held by the Government of Canada on November 13, 1961 that simulated a nuclear attack by the USSR on Canada. Every law enforcement agency, provincial, and municipal government took part in the exercise. Part of the exercise was a 13-minute radio program that was broadcast by every radio transmitter in the country. The broadcast told citizens of Canada what to do in the event of nuclear war.

References

Cold War: Tocsin B - This is not an emergency

Military history of Canada